This is a list of Belgian football transfers for the 2017-18 winter transfer window. Only transfers involving a team from the professional divisions are listed, including the 16 teams in the 2017–18 Belgian First Division A and the 8 teams playing in the 2017–18 Belgian First Division B.

The winter transfer window opens on 1 January 2018, although a few transfers may take place prior to that date. The window closes at midnight on 1 February 2018 although outgoing transfers might still happen to leagues in which the window is still open. Players without a club may join teams, either during or in between transfer windows.

Sorted by date

November

December

End of 2017
Some players were on a loan which ended in 2017. As of 1 January 2018, they returned to their original club and are listed here. For a list of players on loan during the last year, see List of Belgian football transfers winter 2016–17 and summer 2017.

January

February

Sorted by team

Belgian First Division A teams

Anderlecht

In:

Out:

Antwerp

In:

Out:

Charleroi

In:

Out:

Club Brugge

In:

Out:

Eupen

In:

Out:

Excel Mouscron

In:

Out:

Genk

In:

Out:

Gent

In:

Out:

Kortrijk

In:

Out:

Lokeren

In:

Out:

Mechelen

In:

Out:

Oostende

In:

Out:

Sint-Truiden

In:

Out:

Standard Liège

In:

Out:

Waasland-Beveren

In:

Out:

Zulte-Waregem

In:

Out:

Belgian First Division B teams

Beerschot Wilrijk

In:

Out:

Cercle Brugge

In:

Out:

Lierse

In:

Out:

OH Leuven

In:

Out:

Roeselare

In:

Out:

Tubize

In:

 

Out:

Union SG

In:

Out:

Westerlo

In:

Out:

Footnotes

References

Belgian
Transfers Winter
2017 Winter